La bonne année (also known in the United States as Happy New Year) is a 1973 film directed by Claude Lelouch. It tells the story of a gangster who organises a successful heist but is himself caught and jailed. Released early, he not only recoups his share of the takings but also regains his girlfriend.

Plot
The gangster Simon and his faithful accomplice Charlot take a holiday in Cannes. Their plan is to rob the Van Cleef & Arpels jewellery shop on the seafront. Exhaustively, they watch and log the movements of the staff and the security routines. Disguised as a rich old man, Simon gets to know the manager by choosing items for an alleged sick sister. He also gets distracted by Françoise, the beautiful owner of the antiques shop next door. She is on her own and willing to enjoy dates. 

On the night of the heist, Charlot manages to hide in the shop at closing time and at gunpoint gets the manager to fill an attaché case with all the jewels and cash. He then lets Simon in and heads off with the loot in a speedboat. As Simon ties and gags the manager, the place is surrounded by police because an alarm had been triggered. Françoise visits Simon in jail and promises she will wait for him.

After six years, as the police have not found Charlot or any of the loot, they think of a plan. They will get Simon released early and shadow him. He eludes his pursuers and finds Charlot, who gives him his share and drives him to the airport for a plane to Brazil. Waiting for his flight to be called, he rings Françoise. She tells him to come to her apartment immediately, which he does.

Cast
 Lino Ventura : Simon
 Françoise Fabian : Françoise
 Charles Gérard : Charlot
 André Falcon : bijoutier
 Lilo De La Passardière : Mme Félix
 Claude Mann : Claude
 Frédéric de Pasquale : Henri
 Gérard Sire : directeur de la prison/voix commentaire TV
 Silvano Tranquilli : amant italien
 Bettina Rheims : Nicole
 Georges Staquet : commissaire
 Harry Walter : 1st inspecteur
 Elie Chouraqui : Michel Barbier (non crédité)
 Michel Bertay : chauffeur de taxi
 Michou (cabaret artist) : Lui-même
 Mireille Mathieu : Elle-même
 André Barello
 Norman de la Chesnaye
 Pierre Edeline
 Pierre Cottier
 Joseph Rythmann
 Jacques Villedieu.
 Pierre Pontiche

Financing and production 
Much of the film was financed by advertising, particularly for Van Cleef & Arpels.

Awards
 Best actor at the San Remo Film Festival for Lino Ventura and Françoise Fabian
 Prix Triomphe du Cinéma 1973

American remake
The film was remade as Happy New Year (1987), directed by John G. Avildsen and starring Peter Falk, Charles Durning and Tom Courtenay.

External links
 

1973 films
1970s French-language films
1970s crime comedy-drama films
1970s heist films
Films directed by Claude Lelouch
Films scored by Francis Lai
French crime comedy-drama films
French heist films
1973 comedy films
1973 drama films
1970s French films